The men's single sculls competition at the 2012 Summer Paralympics in London took place are at Dorney Lake which, for the purposes of the Games venue, is officially termed Eton Dorney.

Results

Heats
The winner of each heat qualify to the finals, remainder goes to the repechage.

Heat 1

Heat 2

Repechages
First two of each heat qualify to the finals, remainder goes to the Final B.

Repechage 1

Repechage 2

Finals

Final A

Final B

Men's single sculls